Amina Vasilovna Zaripova (born 10 August 1976) is a retired Russian individual rhythmic gymnast who now works as an elite rhythmic gymnastics coach. She is the 1994 World All-around silver medalist, 1993 World All-around bronze medalist and a two time (1996, 1994) European All-around bronze medalist. She finished fourth at the 1996 Olympic Games in Atlanta.

Personal life 
Amina Zaripova is of Tatar descent. She is married to Alexei Kortnev, lead singer of Neschastny Sluchai, with whom she has two sons, Arseniy and Afanasiy, and two daughters, Aksiniya and Agafiya.

Career 
Zaripova studied ballet until the age of ten when she caught the eye of then-Uzbek head coach Irina Viner. When Viner relocated to Moscow to become the Russian head coach, Zaripova followed. early in her career, she was called the second Zaripova who shares the same last name of Viner's first international gymnast Venera Zaripova.

At the 1991 European Junior Championships, Zaripova won her first set of medals—gold for the team event and bronze for the all-round and clubs.

After the death of Oxana Kostina, Zaripova became the leader of the Russian national composition. Zaripova along with Julia Rosliakova and Inessa Gizikova won bronze in the team at the 1993 World Championships, she also won bronze in the all-around. The following year, she placed second at Corbeil-Essonnes International and third at the 1994 European Championships, earning four medals in the apparatus finals with gold for ball, clubs and bronze for hoop, ribbon. She also won three titles at the 1994 Goodwill Games, the (all-round, hoop, ball), as well as a silver medal (clubs) and a bronze medal (ribbon).

At her next World event, Zaripova placed second in All-round at the 1994 World Championships, where she also came in third with clubs and second with ribbon.   She was leading going into the final apparatus of the All Around, but a mistake in her final routine cost her the All Around gold which went to the 93, 94, and 95 world AA champion Maria Petrova.   The following years, she was overshadowed by rising Russians stars Yanina Batyrchina and Natalia Lipkovskaya. At the 1995 World Championships, Batyrchina won the bronze medal while Zaripova finished fourth. Zaripova finished 4th in the All-around at the 1996 Summer Olympics in Atlanta, narrowly losing to both Ukraine's Olena Vitrychenko and her teammate Yanina Batyrchina who controversially held on for silver after she made a mistake in her final routine.   She finished less than a tenth of a point behind both the silver and bronze medalists.

At the end of 1996, Zaripova underwent surgery to repair a torn left Achilles' tendon. She briefly returned to competition in 1997 as part of the Russian team that won the bronze at the 1998 European Championships. Zaripova's final event was the Schmiden International where she won gold medal for her ball exercise and silver for hoop. She then retired from competition.

Zaripova was invited by the Greek Gymnastics Federation to coach their team. She helped prepare the team for the 1999 World Championships, but ended up returning to Russia shortly afterwards. In addition to publishing her own rhythmic gymnastics magazine, she works as a coach in Moscow.

Notable trainees include:

Margarita Mamun – 2016 Olympic champion, twice All-around World silver medalist and three-time Russian National All-around champion.
Daria Trubnikova – 2018 Youth Olympics Champion, 2018 European Junior Clubs champion and 2019 Grand Prix Final all-around gold medallist.
Maria Sergeeva – 2018 Grand Prix Final All-around bronze medalist and 2016 European Junior Hoop champion.
Yana Lukonina – 2010 World Team gold medalist and 2010 Russian National all-around bronze medalist.

Detailed Olympic results

References

External links
 
 
 
 

1976 births
Living people
People from Tashkent Region
Russian rhythmic gymnasts
Russian gymnastics coaches
Olympic gymnasts of Russia
Gymnasts at the 1996 Summer Olympics
Uzbekistani people of Tatar descent
Honoured Coaches of Russia
Tatar people of Russia
Tatar sportspeople
Honoured Masters of Sport of the USSR
Medalists at the Rhythmic Gymnastics World Championships
Medalists at the Rhythmic Gymnastics European Championships
Universiade medalists in gymnastics
Universiade gold medalists for Russia
Universiade silver medalists for Russia
Universiade bronze medalists for Russia
Goodwill Games medalists in gymnastics
Russian people of Uzbekistani descent
Medalists at the 1997 Summer Universiade
Competitors at the 1994 Goodwill Games